Kazimir Strzepek is a cartoonist living in Seattle Washington.  He is the creator of the 2006 Eisner nominated graphic novel The Mourning Star.  The Mourning Star also won an Ignatz during the 2007 Small Press Expo. He grew up in Hawaii and went to the University of Hawaii for a degree in computer animation.

References

 The Comics Reporter
 SCUBOTCH WEBSITE

Living people
American cartoonists
Ignatz Award winners for Outstanding Series
Year of birth missing (living people)